Vermont has the twenty-fifth-highest per capita income in the United States of America, at $20,625 (2000).  Its personal per capita income is $30,740 (2003).

Vermont counties ranked by per capita income

Note: Data is from the 2010 United States Census Data and the 2006-2010 American Community Survey 5-Year Estimates.

References

United States locations by per capita income
Locations by per capita income
Income